Sotirios Notaris (1896 – 1971) was a Greek wrestler. He competed in the Greco-Roman middleweight event at the 1920 Summer Olympics.

References

External links
 

1896 births
1971 deaths
Olympic wrestlers of Greece
Wrestlers at the 1920 Summer Olympics
Greek male sport wrestlers
Sportspeople from Istanbul
Constantinopolitan Greeks
Emigrants from the Ottoman Empire to Greece